The 12mm Lefaucheux is a metallic center-fire cartridge. It was originally created as a rimless pinfire cartridge using black powder employed by the French navy on the Lefaucheux M1858 revolver. Later adapted for center-fire by the French Army in 1873 for use on the MAS 1873 revolver.

Overview
Originally, the 12 mm, was a classic Lefaucheux cartridge, with a side pin from its introduction in 1858 until 1873, when it was adapted and became a rimmed center-fire cartridge for use in the MAS revolver 1873-1874 then used by the French Army.

Features

These are the characteristics of the '12 mm Lefaucheux' cartridge:
 Brass case
 Caliber: 12mm
 Ammo: 12 X 17
 Bullet diameter: 11.30 - 11.40 mm (.444" - .448")
 Neck diameter: 11.80 - 11.85 mm (.464" - .466)
 Base diameter: 11.90 - 11.92 mm (.468" - .469")
 Rim diameter: 12.64 - 12.66 mm (.497" - .498")
 Rim thickness: 0.9 - 1.0 mm (.035" - .039")
 Case length: 19.90 - 20.00 mm (.783" - .787")
 Overall length: 30.77 - 30.80 mm (1.211" - 1.212")
 Primer: patented GAUPILLAT
 Total weight: 18.34 grams
 Bullet weight (lead): 12.80 grams
 Cartridge weight: 4.74 grams
 Black powder charge: 0.80 g

These are the most frequently encountered ("headstamp") tags:
 1 / E / 82 / G. E
 4 / F / 82 / G.E
 1 / G / 82 / G. E
 4 / G / 82 / G.E
 4 / M / 82 / G. E
 4 / K / 82 / G. E

In these markings, the initials "G. E" referring to the manufacturer "Ernest Gaupillat", and the other letter and digits referring to the batch (probably place and date).

Dimensions

See also
 12 mm caliber
 List of handgun cartridges

References

External links

Pistol and rifle cartridges
Military cartridges